Leszek Lichota (born 17 August 1977, Wałbrzych, Poland) is a Polish actor, best known for playing Grzegorz in Polish soap opera Na Wspólnej.

Life and career
In 2002, he graduated from the National Academy of Dramatic Art in Warsaw and started performing at the Polish Theatre in Poznań. He made his theatre debut in the role of Nany Sirbangh in Roman Jaworski's play Hamlet Wtóry. He also appeared on popular TV series such as Na Wspólnej and Prawo Agaty. In 2011, he was nominated to the Zbigniew Cybulski Award for his role in a 2010 film Lynch. His other notable roles are featured in Krzysztof Łukaszewicz's 2015 war drama Karbala and in Jan Komasa's 2019 film Corpus Christi.

Personal life
He is married to Ilona Wrońska with whom he has two children: daughter Natasha (born 2006) and son Kajetan (born 2008). He is a fan and popularizer of snooker.

Films
 2019: Corpus Christi as Mayor
 2015: Karbala 2014: Wataha (original production of HBO Poland) as Wiktor Rebrow
 2009: Generał Nil as "Klemm"
 2007: Odwróceni as Łukasz Ozga
 2007: Świadek koronny 2006: Apetyt na miłość as Lichota
 2005: Niania (Polish version of The Nanny as Juliusz Wilczur
 2005: Dzień dobry kochanie as a priest
 2005–2007: Egzamin z życia as Jacek Bednarz
 2004: Caméra Café as a firefighter
 2003–2008, 2009-: Na Wspólnej as Grzegorz Zięba
 2003: Cyrano 2002–2007: Samo Życie 2002: Edward II as Leicester
 2001: Przedwiośnie as Officer
 2001: Quo vadis 2001: Marszałek Piłsudski 2000–2001: Miasteczko 1999: Patrzę na ciebie, Marysiu'' as a student

Polish dubbing 
 Fantastic Four: World's Greatest Heroes (2006) – Mister Fantastic
 Danny Phantom (2004–2007)

References

Polish male film actors
Polish film actors
1977 births
Living people
Polish male stage actors
Polish male television actors
People from Wałbrzych
Aleksander Zelwerowicz National Academy of Dramatic Art in Warsaw alumni